This is a list of Northwestern State Demons football players in the NFL Draft.

Key

Selections

References

Northwestern State

Northwestern State Demons NFL Draft